Kayleigh Anne Marie Green (born 22 March 1988) is a Welsh professional footballer who plays as a forward for the Wales national team and FA WSL 1 club Brighton & Hove Albion.

Green began her career with Cardiff City, before joining Yeovil Town in 2016.  She spent time on loan with Italian side Chieti Calcio Femminile in 2017.

Early life
Green was born in Cardiff, growing up in the Llanedeyrn area of the city. She is one of four children born to her parents, Dave and Cathy Sellwood. She has three brothers. She played football as a teenager but gave up playing on a regular basis at the age of 16, working several different jobs. Green worked at branches of Tesco and Morrisons, in a call centre and studied plumbing in college.

Club career
Green decided to return to playing senior football in 2012, joining Cardiff City. She joined Yeovil Town in 2016 and spent time on loan with Italian team Chieti Calcio Femminile during her time there, making five appearances for the Serie B side. In 2018, Green joined FA WSL 1 club Brighton & Hove Albion upon the expiration of her contract with Yeovil. Green had previously continued working full-time alongside her playing career prior to joining Brighton.

2020–21 season 

On 18 October 2020, Green was seen to be awarded 2 yellow cards in a 2–2 away draw at Everton by referee Lucy Oliver but was not sent off. Toffees boss Willie Kirk told BBC Sport, "It's frustrating the referee made that mistake."

International career
Green made her debut for the Wales women's national football team in 2012 against Norway. Green was named in Wales' squad at the Cyprus Women's Cup as a centre-forward. Wales manager Jayne Ludlow moved Green from her usual position as a defender to play as a centre-forward for a match against Finland, in which she scored.

International goals

References

External links 
 

1988 births
Living people
Wales women's international footballers
Welsh women's footballers
Women's association football midfielders
Cardiff City Ladies F.C. players
Yeovil Town L.F.C. players
Women's Super League players
Serie A (women's football) players
Welsh expatriates in Italy
Expatriate women's footballers in Italy
Brighton & Hove Albion W.F.C. players